Jan Siemons (born 26 May 1964) is a Dutch former racing cyclist. He rode in the Giro d'Italia and the Tour de France.

References

External links

1964 births
Living people
Dutch male cyclists
Cyclists from Zundert